Colwyn Roger Rowe (born 22 March 1956) is an English football coach and former professional player.

Career

Playing career
Rowe began his professional career in 1973 with Colchester United, before signing with Chelmsford City in 1975.

Coaching career
After retiring as a professional player, Rowe began work as a professional football coach, and has coached in numerous countries around the world. He began his career as manager of several semi-professional teams in England, such as Lowestoft Town, Ipswich Wanderers, Woodbridge Town, and Heybridge Swifts. Rowe was responsible for setting up the PASE scheme a football academy for aspiring footballers to train full-time alongside education with Ioswich Wanderers and also Woodbridge Town. In 2004 Rowe ran a FA course for coaches from war-torn Iraq. In 2005, he helped to set up the youth programme of the Jordan national side. He became the manager of the Botswana national team in August 2006, before leaving in June 2008. In June 2008 he became the Technical Director & Football Manager of the Al Ahly youth section.

He became manager of Saint Vincent and the Grenadines in February 2011, leaving that role in April 2012.

Personal life
Rowe is married and has two sons, Jonathan and James.

References

1956 births
Living people
Association football wingers
English footballers
English football managers
Colchester United F.C. players
Chelmsford City F.C. players
Lowestoft Town F.C. managers
Ipswich Wanderers F.C. managers
Botswana national football team managers
Sportspeople from Ipswich
Expatriate football managers in Botswana
English expatriate football managers
Expatriate football managers in Saint Vincent and the Grenadines
Saint Vincent and the Grenadines national football team managers